A right is a legal or moral entitlement or permission.

Right may also refer to:
 Right, synonym of true or accurate, opposite of wrong
 Morally right, opposite of morally wrong
 Right (direction), the relative direction opposite of left
 Right-wing politics, in general or a political party associated with right-wing politics
 Right (song), a 1975 song from the album Young Americans by David Bowie
 "Right", a 2020 song from the album Circles by Mac Miller

Political parties
 The Right (Italy) (Italian: La Destra), a political party in Italy
 The Right (Germany) (German: Die Rechte), a political party in Germany
 The Right (France) (French: La Droite), a political party in France
 The Right (Swedish: Högern), a political party in Sweden, today called the Moderate Party
 Parempoolsed, a political party in Estonia

See also
 Copyright
 
 
 
 Correct (disambiguation)
 Illegal (disambiguation)
 Legal (disambiguation)
 Left (disambiguation)
 Outline of rights
 Right precedence, a Jewish tradition to give precedence to the right side of things
 True (disambiguation)
 Wrong (disambiguation)

no:Rett
nn:Rett
yi:רעכט